Aikanaka is the name of:
 Aikanaka (mythology), mortal who married Lona, the moon goddess
 Aikanaka of Kauai (born ca. 1680) also known as Kaweloaikanaka, 18th Alii Aimoku of Kauai; ruled as titular chief of Kauai
 ʻAikanaka (father of Keohokālole) (died 1837), Hawaiian grand chief and grandfather of King Kalakaua

See also 
 Aikana (disambiguation)
 Ekanayake

Masculine given names